Henry Dickson Greenlees known as Harry Greenlees (31 July 1903 – 23 May 1969) was a rugby union fly-half who played 153 games for Leicester Tigers and 6 games for Scotland between 1926 and 1932.

The Greenlees family was in the footwear trade and this led them to relocate from Glasgow to Leicester.  Greenlees made his Leicester debut against Old Blues on 20 March 1926 at Welford Road in the unusual position of scrum-half, Greenlees played 5 games in the position that season.  1926/27 season saw Greenlees in his more usual position of fly-half, starting 34 of the club's 41 matches in the position.

This was Greenlees' only defeat in his 6 caps.

He was selected for the 1930 British Lions tour to New Zealand and Australia but was unable to take the time away from work.  He was captain of Leicester from 1930 to 1932 and was top points scorer in the 1931/32 season.

Sources
Farmer,Stuart & Hands, David Tigers-Official History of Leicester Football Club (The Rugby DevelopmentFoundation )

References

1903 births
1969 deaths
Leicester Tigers players
Rugby union fly-halves
Rugby union players from Glasgow
Scotland international rugby union players
Scottish rugby union players